The Kadowaki–Woods ratio is the ratio of A, the quadratic term of the resistivity and γ2, the linear term of the specific heat. This ratio is found to be a constant for transition metals, and for heavy-fermion compounds, although at different values.

In 1968 M. J. Rice pointed out that the coefficient A should vary predominantly as the square of the linear electronic specific heat coefficient γ; in particular he showed that the ratio A/γ2  is material independent for the pure 3d, 4d and 5d transition metals. Heavy-fermion compounds are characterized by very large values of A and γ. Kadowaki and Woods showed that A/γ2 is material-independent within the heavy-fermion compounds, and that it is about 25 times larger than in aforementioned transition metals.

According to the theory of electron-electron scattering the ratio A/γ2 contains indeed several non-universal factors, including the square of the strength of the effective electron-electron interaction. Since in general the interactions differ in nature from one group of materials to another, the same values of A/γ2 are only  expected within a particular group.  In 2005 Hussey proposed a re-scaling of A/γ2 to account for unit cell volume, dimensionality, carrier density and multi-band effects. In 2009 Jacko, Fjaerestad, and Powell demonstrated fdx(n)A/γ2 to have the same value in transition metals, heavy fermions, organics and oxides with A varying over 10 orders of magnitude, where fdx(n) may be written in terms of the dimensionality of the system, the electron density and, in layered systems, the interlayer spacing or the interlayer hopping integral.

See also

 Wilson ratio

References

Correlated electrons
Condensed matter physics
Fermions